Deathfame (stylized in all caps) is a solo studio album by American rapper and producer Quelle Chris. It was released via Mello Music Group on May 13, 2022. Production was handled by Chris Keys, Knxwledge, and Quelle Chris himself. It features guest appearances from Cavalier, Denmark Vessey, J Jig Cicero, MoRuf, Navy Blue, and Pink Siifu.

Critical reception

Deathfame was met with acclaim from music critics. At Metacritic, which assigns a normalized rating out of 100 to reviews from mainstream publications, the album received an average score of 81, based on five reviews.

In his review for HipHopDX Matthew Ritchie wrote: "it's a continuation of his intense focus on a singular topic, which results in a clear elevation in quality that few could hope to achieve, setting the standard for any plan to follow his formula". Pitchfork reviewer Nadine Smith wrote: "balancing broad comedy with pointed political satire, the Detroit rapper continues his evolution from skilled MC to producer polymath on his latest album". Tim Sentz of Beats Per Minute wrote: "not since Everything's Fine has Quelle Chris sounded so surefire and determined. He wears beats with flair now, and lyrically he's in top form, moving like a chameleon behind the mic and in front. Deathfame is easily the best solo outing for Chris so far". In his YouTube channel The Needle Drop, Anthony Fantano stated: "Quelle Chris delivers what might be his most challenging album yet". AllMusic's Paul Simpson wrote: "even as Quelle Chris' music grows more challenging, it's still highly compelling, and his lyrics are filled with sharp, powerful observations about life, death, success, and failure". Writing for Crack Magazine, Dean Van Nguyen said: "the beats veer between jazz club grooves (the tinkling piano of So Tired You Can't Stop Dreaming featuring Navy Blue), smooth sophisti-pop (the saxophone riff of Die Happy Knowing They'll Care) and grubby loops that creep like a villain though rain-streaked streets at night".

Year-end lists

Track listing

Personnel
Credits adapted from liner notes.

 Gavin Christopher Tennille – main artist, producer (tracks: 1-12, 14), mixing
 Chris Keys – producer (tracks: 1, 2, 4, 11, 13)
 Glen Earl "Knxwledge" Boothe – producer (track 13)
 dane.zone – mastering
 Sage "Navy Blue" Elsesser – featured artist (track 6)
 Denmark Vessey – featured artist (track 12)
 J Jig Cicero – featured artist (track 12)
 MoRuf Adewunmi – featured artist (track 13)
 Livingston "Pink Siifu" Matthews – featured artist (track 13)
 Cavalier – featured artist (track 14)

References

External links
 

2022 albums
Hip hop albums by American artists
Mello Music Group albums
Albums produced by Knxwledge
Albums produced by Quelle Chris